Bjarnason is a surname of Icelandic origin, meaning son of Bjarni. In Icelandic names, the name is not strictly a surname, but a patronymic. The name may refer to:
Ágúst H. Bjarnason (1875–1952), Icelandic psychologist, professor, and author
Birkir Bjarnason (born 1988), Icelandic professional football player
Bjarni Bjarnason (born 1965), Icelandic author and poet
Björn Bjarnason (born 1944), Icelandic politician, Minister of Justice and Ecclesiastical Affairs since 2003
Brynjólfur Bjarnason (1898–?), Icelandic communist politician
Dóra S. Bjarnason (born 1947), Icelandic sociologist and educator
Ólafur Örn Bjarnason (born 1975), Icelandic professional football player
Teddy Bjarnason (born 1987), Icelandic professional football player

See also
Bjarnason Island

Patronymics
Icelandic-language surnames